The Extraordinary and Plenipotentiary Ambassador of the Federal Republic of Germany in Peru is the official representative of the Federal Republic of Germany to the Republic of Peru.

Peru officially established bilateral relations with modern Germany's predecessors in 1828, among them the North German Confederation in 1870 (which was succeeded by the German Empire) and have since maintained diplomatic relations with two exceptions where Peru has severed its relations: in October 1917, as a result of World War I (later reestablished in 1921) and January 26, 1942, as a result of the German Reich's declaration of war against the United States during World War II.

After the Second World War, relations were reestablished in 1951, with the Federal Republic of Germany. After the 1968 Peruvian coup d'état and the establishment of Juan Velasco Alvarado's Revolutionary Government, relations with the German Democratic Republic were also established on December 28, 1972.

List of representatives

German Reich (1871–1942)

German Democratic Republic (1972–1990)

Federal Republic of Germany (1952–present)

See also
List of ambassadors of Peru to Germany
Embassy of Germany, Lima

References

Peru
Germany